Kaghnut is a village in the Kapan Municipality of the Syunik Province in Armenia.

Etymology 
The village was previously known as Moghes.

Demographics

Population 
The Statistical Committee of Armenia reported its population as 105 in 2011, down from 109 in 2010, down from 117 at the 2001 census.

References 

Populated places in Syunik Province